Kambiwa is a genus of Brazilian cellar spiders that was first described by B. A. Huber in 2000.  it contains only two species, found only in Brazil: K. anomala and K. neotropica.

See also
 List of Pholcidae species

References

Araneomorphae genera
Pholcidae
Spiders of Brazil